Nama-i farhangistan (translated: Writings of the Academy), was a Persian-language magazine that was published monthly in Tehran between 1943 and 1947. A total of 10 issues in 5 volumes were published.

Description 
The magazine was the publication organ of the Academy of Iran (pers. Farhangistān-i Īrān), founded in 1935, the predecessor of the Academy for Persian Language and Literature, and thus became an important pioneer for linguistic research and language reforms in the Pahlavi era. 

Among the members of the Academy were well-known politicians and diplomats, numerous famous Iranian writers and scholars of that time, such as Abbas Iqbal (1896-1955), the founder of the magazine Yadgar, and Ali-Akbar Dehchoda (1879-1956), the co-founder of the magazine Sur-e Esrafil and author of the Dictionary of Dehchoda (Loghat-nāme-ye Dehchodā) - the most important and comprehensive dictionary of the Persian language and literature. 

The Academy, whose primary objective was to preserve and protect the Persian language, in particular used the journal for publishing Persian equivalents to replace certain foreign words. From 1995 on the publication organ experienced a quarterly reprint of the same name.

References

External links
 Online-Version: Nāma-i farhangistān
 Digital Collections: Arabische, persische und osmanisch-türkische Periodika

1943 establishments in Iran
1947 disestablishments in Iran
Defunct magazines published in Iran
Magazines established in 1943
Magazines disestablished in 1947
Magazines published in Tehran
Monthly magazines published in Iran
Persian-language magazines
Pahlavi Iran